The temporal styloid process is a slender bony process of the temporal bone extending downward and forward from the undersurface of the temporal bone just below the ear. The styloid process gives attachments to several muscles, and ligaments.

Structure
The styloid process is a slender and pointed bony process of the temporal bone projecting anteroinferiorly from the inferior surface of the temporal bone just below the ear. Its length normally ranges from just under 3 cm to just over 4 cm. It is usually nearly straight, but may be curved in some individuals.

Its proximal (tympanohyal) part is ensheathed by the tympanic part of the temporal bone (vaginal process), whereas its distal (stylohyal) part gives attachment to several structures.

Attachments 
The styloid process gives attachments to several muscles, and ligaments. It serves as an anchor point for several muscles associated with the tongue and larynx. 
 stylohyoid ligament
 stylomandibular ligament
 styloglossus muscle (innervated by the hypoglossal nerve)
 stylohyoid muscle (innervated by the facial nerve)
 stylopharyngeus muscle (innervated by the glossopharyngeal nerve)

Relations 
The parotid gland is situated laterally to the styloid process, the external carotid artery passes by its apex, the facial nerve crosses its base, and the attachment of the stylopharyngeus muscle separates it from the internal jugular vein medially.

Clinical significance 
A small percentage of the population will suffer from an elongation of the styloid process and stylohyoid ligament calcification. This condition is also known as Eagle syndrome. The tissues in the throat rub on the styloid process during the act of swallowing with resulting pain along the glossopharyngeal nerve. There is also pain upon turning the head or extending the tongue. Other symptoms may include voice alteration, cough, dizziness, migraines, occipital neuralgia, pain in teeth and jaw and sinusitis or bloodshot eyes.

Development
The styloid process arises from endochondral ossification of the cartilage from the second pharyngeal arch.

Additional images

References

External links

 
 
 

Bones of the head and neck